Locust Grove is an unincorporated community and ghost town in Sherman County, Oregon, United States. It is located on Oregon Route 206, six miles west of Wasco.

Established in 1895, the town's last burial occurred in 1914, and it has remained unoccupied since.

References

Unincorporated communities in Sherman County, Oregon
Unincorporated communities in Oregon
Ghost towns in Oregon